Celeste Marshall (born September 30, 1992) is a Bahamian model and national titleholder who won Miss Universe Bahamas 2012 and represented her country in the 2012 Miss Universe pageant.

Miss Universe Bahamas 2012 & Miss Universe 2012
Celeste Marshall has been crowned Miss Bahamas Universe 2012 at the grand finale of the Miss Bahamas Universe beauty pageant, where she competed in a field of fourteen contestants. She represented her country in Miss Universe 2012, which was held at the Planet Hollywood Resort and Casino in Las Vegas, Nevada on Wednesday December 19, 2012.

Following Miss Universe, Marshall became part of the Top Model competition.

References

External links
 

Living people
Miss Universe 2012 contestants
Bahamian beauty pageant winners
People from Nassau, Bahamas
1992 births